Saint Brandon may refer to:

St. Brandon an Indian Ocean archipelago
Brendan an Irish saint of the early Middle Ages